The 1984 Michigan Wolverines baseball team represented the University of Michigan in the 1984 NCAA Division I baseball season. The head coach was Bud Middaugh, serving his 5th year. The Wolverines finished the season in 7th place in the 1984 College World Series.

Roster

Schedule 

! style="" | Regular Season
|- valign="top" 

|- align="center" bgcolor="#ffcccc"
| 1 || March 16 || vs  || Unknown • Edinburg, Texas || 8–9 || 0–1 || 0–0
|- align="center" bgcolor="#ccffcc"
| 2 || March 17 || vs  || Unknown • Edinburg, Texas || 7–6 || 1–1 || 0–0
|- align="center" bgcolor="#ffcccc"
| 3 || March 19 || vs Bradley || Unknown • Edinburg, Texas || 9–10 || 1–2 || 0–0
|- align="center" bgcolor="#ccffcc"
| 4 || March 20 || vs Bradley || Unknown • Edinburg, Texas || 5–3 || 2–2 || 0–0
|- align="center" bgcolor="#ffcccc"
| 5 || March 21 || at  || Unknown • Edinburg, Texas || 8–12 || 2–3 || 0–0
|- align="center" bgcolor="#ffcccc"
| 6 || March 22 || vs  || Unknown • Edinburg, Texas || 9–10 || 2–4 || 0–0
|- align="center" bgcolor="#ffcccc"
| 7 || March 22 || vs  || Unknown • Edinburg, Texas || 2–13 || 2–5 || 0–0
|- align="center" bgcolor="#ffcccc"
| 8 || March 23 || vs Miami (OH) || Unknown • Edinburg, Texas || 2–11 || 2–6 || 0–0
|- align="center" bgcolor="#ffcccc"
| 9 || March 23 || vs Maine || Unknown • Edinburg, Texas || 3–6 || 2–7 || 0–0
|- align="center" bgcolor="#ccffcc"
| 10 || March 24 || at Texas–Pan American || Unknown • Edinburg, Texas || 4–2 || 3–7 || 0–0
|- align="center" bgcolor="#ccffcc"
| 11 || March 27 || vs  || Unknown • Unknown, Michigan || 6–1 || 4–7 || 0–0
|- align="center" bgcolor="#ccffcc"
| 12 || March 27 || vs Grand Valley State || Unknown • Unknown, Michigan || 4–3 || 5–7 || 0–0
|- align="center" bgcolor="#ffcccc"
| 13 || March 30 || at Miami (OH) || Unknown • Oxford, Ohio || 1–2 || 5–8 || 0–0
|- align="center" bgcolor="#ccffcc"
| 14 || March 30 || at Miami (OH) || Unknown • Oxford, Ohio || 5–2 || 6–8 || 0–0
|- align="center" bgcolor="#ccffcc"
| 15 || March 31 || at Miami (OH) || Unknown • Oxford, Ohio || 9–3 || 7–8 || 0–0
|- align="center" bgcolor="#ccffcc"
| 16 || March 31 || at Miami (OH) || Unknown • Oxford, Ohio || 11–7 || 8–8 || 0–0
|-

|- align="center" bgcolor="#ccffcc"
| 17 || April 1 || at  || Steller Field • Bowling Green, Ohio || 6–3 || 9–8 || 0–0
|- align="center" bgcolor="#ccffcc"
| 18 || April 1 || at Bowling Green || Steller Field • Bowling Green, Ohio || 4–0 || 10–8 || 0–0
|- align="center" bgcolor="#ccffcc"
| 19 || April 4 || vs  || Unknown • Unknown, Michigan || 7–1 || 11–8 || 0–0
|- align="center" bgcolor="#ccffcc"
| 20 || April 4 || vs Western Michigan || Unknown • Unknown, Michigan || 5–1 || 12–8 || 0–0
|- align="center" bgcolor="#ccffcc"
| 21 || April 7 || vs  || Unknown • Unknown, Michigan || 2–1 || 13–8 || 0–0
|- align="center" bgcolor="#ccffcc"
| 22 || April 7 || vs Detroit || Unknown • Unknown, Michigan || 7–2 || 14–8 || 0–0
|- align="center" bgcolor="#ffcccc"
| 23 || April 8 || vs  || Unknown • Unknown, Michigan || 2–3 || 14–9 || 0–0
|- align="center" bgcolor="#ccffcc"
| 24 || April 8 || vs Eastern Michigan || Unknown • Unknown, Michigan || 9–8 || 15–9 || 0–0
|- align="center" bgcolor="#ccffcc"
| 25 || April 10 || vs  || Unknown • Unknown, Michigan || 19–9 || 16–9 || 0–0
|- align="center" bgcolor="#ccffcc"
| 26 || April 11 ||  || Ray Fisher Stadium • Ann Arbor, Michigan || 5–4 || 17–9 || 0–0
|- align="center" bgcolor="#ccffcc"
| 27 || April 11 || Siena Heights || Ray Fisher Stadium • Ann Arbor, Michigan || 9–3 || 18–9 || 0–0
|- align="center" bgcolor="#ccffcc"
| 28 || April 14 || at  || Sembower Field • Bloomington, Indiana || 16–10 || 19–9 || 1–0
|- align="center" bgcolor="#ffcccc"
| 29 || April 14 || at Indiana || Sembower Field • Bloomington, Indiana || 0–16 || 19–10 || 1–1
|- align="center" bgcolor="#ccffcc"
| 30 || April 15 || at Indiana || Sembower Field • Bloomington, Indiana || 4–1 || 20–10 || 2–1
|- align="center" bgcolor="#ccffcc"
| 31 || April 15 || at Indiana || Sembower Field • Bloomington, Indiana || 3–2 || 21–10 || 3–1
|- align="center" bgcolor="#ccffcc"
| 32 || April 19 || vs  || Unknown • Unknown || 7–3 || 22–10 || 3–1
|- align="center" bgcolor="#ccffcc"
| 33 || April 19 || vs Cleveland State || Unknown • Unknown || 13–3 || 23–10 || 3–1
|- align="center" bgcolor="#ccffcc"
| 34 || April 19 || vs Cleveland State || Unknown • Unknown || 10–6 || 24–10 || 3–1
|- align="center" bgcolor="#ccffcc"
| 35 || April 28 ||  || Ray Fisher Stadium • Ann Arbor, Michigan || 3–2 || 25–10 || 4–1
|- align="center" bgcolor="#ccffcc"
| 36 || April 28 || Ohio State || Ray Fisher Stadium • Ann Arbor, Michigan || 2–0 || 26–10 || 5–1
|- align="center" bgcolor="#ccffcc"
| 37 || April 29 || Ohio State || Ray Fisher Stadium • Ann Arbor, Michigan || 3–1 || 27–10 || 6–1
|- align="center" bgcolor="#ffcccc"
| 38 || April 29 || Ohio State || Ray Fisher Stadium • Ann Arbor, Michigan || 4–8 || 27–11 || 6–2
|-

|- align="center" bgcolor="#ccffcc"
| 39 || May 1 ||  || Ray Fisher Stadium • Ann Arbor, Michigan || 9–0 || 28–11 || 6–2
|- align="center" bgcolor="#ccffcc"
| 40 || May 1 || Adrian || Ray Fisher Stadium • Ann Arbor, Michigan || 12–1 || 29–11 || 6–2
|- align="center" bgcolor="#ffcccc"
| 41 || May 2 ||  || Ray Fisher Stadium • Ann Arbor, Michigan || 4–5 || 29–12 || 6–2
|- align="center" bgcolor="#ccffcc"
| 42 || May 2 || Toledo || Ray Fisher Stadium • Ann Arbor, Michigan || 8–7 || 30–12 || 6–2
|- align="center" bgcolor="#ccffcc"
| 43 || May 5 ||  || Ray Fisher Stadium • Ann Arbor, Michigan || 2–1 || 31–12 || 7–2
|- align="center" bgcolor="#ffcccc"
| 44 || May 5 || Michigan State || Ray Fisher Stadium • Ann Arbor, Michigan || 2–7 || 31–13 || 7–3
|- align="center" bgcolor="#ccffcc"
| 45 || May 6 || at Michigan State || John H. Kobs Field • East Lansing, Michigan || 11–7 || 32–13 || 8–3
|- align="center" bgcolor="#ffcccc"
| 46 || May 6 || at Michigan State || John H. Kobs Field • East Lansing, Michigan || 5–14 || 32–14 || 8–4
|- align="center" bgcolor="#ffcccc"
| 47 || May 8 || vs Wayne State || Unknown • Unknown, Michigan || 0–5 || 32–15 || 8–4
|- align="center" bgcolor="#ccffcc"
| 48 || May 8 || vs Wayne State || Unknown • Unknown, Michigan || 11–6 || 33–15 || 8–4
|- align="center" bgcolor="#ccffcc"
| 49 || May 9 || vs Eastern Michigan || Unknown • Unknown, Michigan || 8–6 || 34–15 || 8–4
|- align="center" bgcolor="#ffcccc"
| 50 || May 9 || vs Eastern Michigan || Unknown • Unknown, Michigan || 7–8 || 34–16 || 8–4
|- align="center" bgcolor="#ccffcc"
| 51 || May 12 || at  || Lambert Field • West Lafayette, Indiana || 11–3 || 35–16 || 9–4
|- align="center" bgcolor="#ccffcc"
| 52 || May 12 || at Purdue || Lambert Field • West Lafayette, Indiana || 4–2 || 36–16 || 10–4
|- align="center" bgcolor="#ccffcc"
| 53 || May 13 || at Purdue || Lambert Field • West Lafayette, Indiana || 15–2 || 37–16 || 11–4
|- align="center" bgcolor="#ffcccc"
| 54 || May 13 || at Purdue || Lambert Field • West Lafayette, Indiana || 7–11 || 37–17 || 11–5
|-

|-
|-
! style="" | Postseason
|- valign="top"

|- align="center" bgcolor="#ccffcc"
| 55 || May 18 || vs  || Siebert Field • Minneapolis, Minnesota || 13–1 || 38–17 || 11–5
|- align="center" bgcolor="#ccffcc"
| 56 || May 19 || vs  || Siebert Field • Minneapolis, Minnesota || 6–3 || 39–17 || 11–5
|- align="center" bgcolor="#ffcccc"
| 57 || May 20 || vs Northwestern || Siebert Field • Minneapolis, Minnesota || 2–6 || 39–18 || 11–5
|- align="center" bgcolor="#ccffcc"
| 58 || May 20 || vs Northwestern || Siebert Field • Minneapolis, Minnesota || 8–3 || 40–18 || 11–5
|-

|- align="center" bgcolor="#ccffcc"
| 59 || May 26 || vs  || Theunissen Stadium • Mount Pleasant, Michigan || 13–9 || 41–18 || 11–5
|- align="center" bgcolor="#ccffcc"
| 60 || May 27 || vs  || Theunissen Stadium • Mount Pleasant, Michigan || 8–2 || 42–18 || 11–5
|- align="center" bgcolor="#ccffcc"
| 61 || May 30 || vs Central Michigan || Theunissen Stadium • Mount Pleasant, Michigan || 4–3 || 43–18 || 11–5
|-

|- align="center" bgcolor="#ffcccc"
| 62 || June 1 || vs Cal State Fullerton || Johnny Rosenblatt Stadium • Omaha, Nebraska || 4–8 || 43–19 || 11–5
|- align="center" bgcolor="#ffcccc"
| 63 || June 3 || vs  || Johnny Rosenblatt Stadium • Omaha, Nebraska || 3–11 || 43–20 || 11–5
|-

Awards and honors 
Ken Hayward
 First Team All-Big Ten

Scott Kamieniecki
 First Team All-Big Ten

Barry Larkin
 American Baseball Coaches Association First Team All-American
 Big Ten Player of the Year
 First Team All-Big Ten

References 

Michigan Wolverines baseball seasons
Michigan Wolverines baseball
College World Series seasons
Big Ten Conference baseball champion seasons
Michigan